AdoptAClassroom.org is a national nonprofit organization based in Minneapolis, MN that provides funding for school supplies to classrooms and needy families.  It was founded in 1998.

Current and past corporate partners include Burlington, Quaker, Staples, Farmers Insurance, Lane Bryant, Maurices, Great Clips, Subaru, OfficeMax, Jones New York, StubHub, Coach, and Office Depot.

History
AdoptAClassroom.org was founded in 1998 by Jamie Rosenberg in Miami, FL.  In 2011, Bob Thacker was hired as the Executive Director of AdoptAClassroom.org and the organization moved to Minneapolis, Minnesota.

Ann Pifer is the current Executive Director of AdoptAClassroom.org.

How it works 
Any K-12 teachers or schools in the United States can register and share their stories and supply needs online. Donors can search the website to locate specific schools and classrooms that need supplies. Donors can give to a specific teacher/school, search for a teacher/school in their community, or give to a Spotlight Fund. Teachers can spend the funds immediately. Donors receive thank you emails, impact stories, and a list of supplies purchased by their adopted classroom.

Disaster Relief Program 
Since 2012, AdoptAClassroom.org's disaster relief program has helped US schools after devastating natural disasters in Paradise, California following massive wildfires (2019); Puerto Rico following Hurricane Maria (2018); Texas following Hurricane Harvey (2018); North Carolina and South Carolina following Hurricane Florence (2018); Baton Rouge, Louisiana following flood damage (2016); Moore, Oklahoma after tornado damage (2013); New York, New York following Hurricane Sandy (2012); and more.

Partnership with Sheryl Crow 
In February 2016, Sheryl Crow became a national spokesperson for AdoptAClassroom.org.

Live Real Change 
In 2013, AdoptAClassroom.org was featured in a television documentary titled Live Real Change. The special discussed the lack of funding in classrooms and celebrated teachers. It featured many celebrities including Justin Bieber, Miley Cyrus, Pitbull (rapper), Lady Antebellum, LMFAO, and Matthew Morrison.

Awards

Burlington | Adopt-A-Classroom 

 2018 GOLD Halo Award Winner in Education

OfficeMax | Adopt-A-Classroom 
 2008 Cause Marketing Halo Award
 Best Social Service/Education Campaign 
 Retail Advertising and Marketing Association Peter Glenn Award

Jones New York in the Classroom | Adopt-A-Classroom
 2006 Cause Marketing Halo Awards
 Best Social Service/Education Campaign 
 Best National/Local Integration 
 American Apparel and Footwear Association's Excellence in Social Responsibility

References 

Charities based in Minnesota
Educational charities based in the United States